Inkwilersee is a small lake on the border of the municipalities of Inkwil, Canton of Berne, and Bolken, Canton of Solothurn, Switzerland.

External links
Inkwilersee  short introduction

Lakes of Switzerland
Lakes of the canton of Solothurn
Lakes of the canton of Bern
LInkwilersee
Bern–Solothurn border